The Sioux County Courthouse, located at the northeast corner of Main and 3rd Streets in Harrison, is the center of government of Sioux County, Nebraska. The courthouse was built in 1930 to replace the county's first courthouse, an 1888 building that had fallen into poor condition. Architect E.L. Goldsmith of Scottsbluff designed the courthouse in the County Citadel style, a Classical Revival-influenced design used in six Nebraska courthouses. The courthouse's design features six fluted pilasters on the front facade and a central entrance with a round arch. The front side of the building also includes a lintel above the doorway, moldings with decorative capitals around the entrance, and a cornice with the inscription "Sioux County Court House".

The courthouse was listed on the National Register of Historic Places in 1990.

References

External links

Courthouses on the National Register of Historic Places in Nebraska
Neoclassical architecture in Nebraska
Government buildings completed in 1930
Buildings and structures in Sioux County, Nebraska
County courthouses in Nebraska
Historic districts on the National Register of Historic Places in Nebraska
National Register of Historic Places in Sioux County, Nebraska